Graham O'Connell  (born 1987) is an Irish Gaelic footballer. He played with the Austin Stacks club of Tralee before joining Limerick side Monaleen and is a member of the Limerickcounty squad. He played underage with Kerry and was part of the 2008 All-Ireland winning u-21 panel.

References
 Kingdom's O'Connell signs up with Treaty - HoganStand

1987 births
Living people
Austin Stacks Gaelic footballers
Garda Síochána officers
Kerry inter-county Gaelic footballers
Limerick inter-county Gaelic footballers
Monaleen Gaelic footballers

ga:Daniel Bohane